This is the discography documenting albums and singles released by American R&B singer El DeBarge.

Albums

Studio albums

Compilation albums

Singles

As lead artist

As featured artist

References

Discographies of American artists